The Hester Rolls are a Cherokee census roll that was taken in 1883 by Joseph G Hester. The census included the Eastern Band of Cherokee Indians

Other Cherokee census rolls include:

 1835 Census of Cherokees Living East of the Mississippi River (also known as the Henderson Roll)
 1848 Mullay Roll
 1851 Siler Roll
 1852 Chapman Roll
 1854 Act of Congress Roll
 1867 Powell Roll
 1869 Swetland Roll
 Dawes Roll

References

Eastern Band of Cherokee Indians
Native American history